Elaine Cancilla Orbach (January 19, 1940 – April 1, 2009) was an American stage and musical theatre actress and dancer.

Career
Orbach, known professionally as Elaine Cancilla, appeared on Broadway and Off Broadway in productions including: Fiorello!, How to Succeed in Business Without Really Trying, Here's Love, Flora the Red Menace, Sweet Charity and Cry for Us All.

Private life
In 1979 she married actor Jerry Orbach, a star on stage and later of film and television (Law & Order). They met several years earlier while appearing together in the original Broadway theatre production of the Kander & Ebb musical, Chicago. They also co-starred in a touring production of Neil Simon's play, Chapter Two.

Following his death in 2004, she petitioned to have a portion of 53rd Street at Eighth Avenue, in New York City's Theater District (and near his long-time home), renamed "Jerry Orbach Way"; it was rechristened in 2007.

Death
She died on April 1, 2009, at age 69, from pneumonia in a hospital in New York City.

References

External links

American female dancers
American musical theatre actresses
American stage actresses
People from Manhattan
Deaths from pneumonia in New York City
1940 births
2009 deaths
Dancers from New York (state)
Dancers from Massachusetts
20th-century American singers
20th-century American women singers
20th-century American dancers
21st-century American women